A Table Alphabeticall is the abbreviated title of the first monolingual dictionary in the English language, created by Robert Cawdrey and first published in London in 1604.

Although the work is important in being the first collection of its kind, it was never deemed a particularly useful work. At only 120 pages, it listed a total of 2,543 words accompanied by very brief (often single-word) definitions. In most cases, it was little more than a list of synonyms. The words chosen by Cawdrey were quite arbitrary and often obscure.

The dictionary's claimed purpose was "for the benefit and helpe of ladies, gentlewomen, or other unskillful persons". Within a few decades, many other English dictionaries followed.

Details
The full title of A Table Alphabeticall is "A Table Alphabeticall, conteyning and teaching the true writing, and vnderſtanding of hard uſuall Engliſh words, borrowed from the Hebrew, Greeke, Latine, or French, &c. With the interpretation thereof by plaine Engliſh words, gathered for the benefit and helpe of ladies, gentlewomen, or any other vnskilfull persons. Whereby they may the more eaſily and better vnderſtand many hard Engliſh words, vvhich they ſhall heare or read in Scriptures, Sermons, or elſe vvhere, and alſo be made able to vſe the same aptly themſelues."

Transliterated into modern English, the title becomes "A table [in] alphabetical [order], containing and teaching the true writing, and understanding of hard usual English words, borrowed from the Hebrew, Greek, Latin, or French, etc [languages]. With the interpretation thereof by plain English words, gathered for the benefit and help of ladies, gentlewomen, or any other unskillful persons. Whereby they may the more easily and better understand many hard English words, which they shall hear or read in scriptures, sermons, or elsewhere, and also be made able to use the same aptly themselves."

A Table Alphabeticall was published in London. The 1604 edition was printed by "I. R." (I. Roberts) for Edmund Weaver (listed as "Edmund Weauer"). The books are marked with a note that they "are to be sold at his shop at the great North dore of Paules Church, 1604".

A Table Alphabeticall proved fairly popular. There was a second edition in 1609, a third edition in 1613, and a fourth edition in 1617. The second and third editions were printed by "T. S." in London for Edmund Weaver. The third edition was "Set forth by R.C. and newly corrected, and much inlarged with many words now in use" and includes the inscription "Legere, et non intelligere, neglegere est" ("To read, and to not understand, is to neglect").

As before, these newer editions were "to be sold at his shop at the great North doore of Paules Church."

The first edition listed 2,543 headwords. The dictionary increased in size with every succeeding edition, until the fourth edition in 1617 defined 3,264 words. The only surviving copy is found at the Bodleian Library in Oxford.

The editors of the Oxford English Dictionary (OED) reference Cawdrey's Table Alphabeticall, but not by name, in the first paragraph of the Historical Introduction. "To set Cawdrey's slim small volume of 1604 beside the completed Oxford Dictionary of 1933 is like placing the original acorn beside the oak that has grown out of it."

References

 The Acorn of the Oak: A Stylistic Approach to Lexicographical Method in Cawdrey's A Table Alphabeticall, Raymond G. Siemens, CCH Working Papers, vol. 4 (1994)
 Dictionnairique et lexicographie, Paris, Didier Érudition, vol. 3: Informatique et dictionnaires anciens (1995).

External links
 The full Table Alphabeticall on University of Toronto Libraries site, including a description of Robert Cawdrey. 
 The Acorn of the Oak: A Stylistic Approach to Lexicographical Method in Cawdrey's A Table Alphabeticall
 Several scanned images available on the British Library website
1604 books
English dictionaries

This link is broken: Table Alphabeticall